Yuri Vyacheslavovich Klochkov (born 3 October 1998) is a Russian football player who plays for Dnepr Mogilev.

Club career
He made his debut in the Russian Professional Football League for FC Chernomorets Novorossiysk on 16 July 2019 in a game against FC SKA Rostov-on-Don.

References

External links
 Profile by Russian Professional Football League
 
 
 Profile at Crimean Football Union

1998 births
Living people
People from Slavyansk-na-Kubani
Sportspeople from Krasnodar Krai
Russian footballers
Association football midfielders
Russian expatriate footballers
Expatriate footballers in Belarus
Crimean Premier League players
FC Chernomorets Novorossiysk players
FC Slutsk players
FC Dnepr Mogilev players